Rat agility is a sport for pet rats. It basically uses scaled down versions of the obstacles used for dog agility. The sport originated in Sweden and can trace its origin back to table runs (owner on one side of the table had to get the rat from the other side to move across the table in the shortest time possible) in the 1980s. It became an official competition in 2000.

Classes
Rat agility is performed in two classes. Class A is for beginners (either the rat or the driver or both) and is divided in two parts, an obstacle track and summoning. Class B is for the more experienced pair. It consists of a more difficult obstacle course and instead of summoning, the rat has to perform a trick.

Jumping course
One of the typical obstacles you may find on a course is the jumping fence, a vertical barrier the rat crawls over (it rarely jumps over them despite the name). The A-fence or ramp is a simple up and down obstacle. The slalom fence or weaving poles consists of a series of vertical sticks the rat has to navigate through. A balance fence is a narrow strip or some kind of suspended walkway. Rats don't like the ground to move so they need to trust the driver to be able to pass it. Another obstacle is the tunnel, the problem is to prevent the rat from taking a break in the middle of the tunnel. The seesaw also plays on the trust in the driver. The rat needs to dare to walk over it. It is also important that the rat doesn't turn and run back when it flips over. The up-and-down-fence is similar to the slalom fence, but vertical instead of horizontal. The rat has to go up and down over and under the sticks. Although some other versions also exist, but these are the most common.

Guidance
In the sport it is the communication between the rat and the owner that is important, as you are not allowed to touch the rat and have to rely on visual and auditory signals. Rats are suitable for agility as they like a challenge and it's a great way to activate and bond with your pet.

See also 
 Cat agility
 Rabbit show jumping also known as rabbit agility

References

External links 
 The Agile Rat
 Eva's Rat Agility Page
 Ratz: Agility & Obedience
 NERS: Tips for Agility Training

Animals in sport
Rats as pets